The 2022 Porsche Paynter Dixon Carrera Cup Australia is the eighteenth running of the Porsche Carrera Cup Australia motor racing series. It began at Albert Park Circuit on April 7 and it will end at Surfers Paradise Street Circuit on October 30. This series will mark the first since 2015 that Porsche Carrera Cup Australia is to be held as a national championship. This year's series will also mark the introduction of the Porsche 911 (992) GT3 Cup for use by all teams in the category.

The season's series was won by Harri Jones.

Calendar

Entries

References

External Links
Official website

Australian Carrera Cup Championship seasons
Porsche Carrera Cup